Sade is a village in the Karmala taluka of Solapur district in Maharashtra state, India.

Demographics 
Covering  and comprising 1077 households at the time of the 2011 census of India, Sade had a population of 4576. There were 2315 males and 2261 females, with 493 people being aged six or younger.

References 

Villages in Karmala taluka